James Henry Bennet (1816–1891) was an English doctor who helped popularize the French Riviera as a Winter holiday destination in the 19th century with his 1861 book Winter and Spring on the Shores of the Mediterranean. Bennet has been described by the Menton Tourist Board as the "Inventor of the Menton resort".

Bennet studied medicine in Paris, and after working as a doctor for 25 years contracted tuberculosis. Bennet went to the small coastal village of Menton in the South of France, close to the Italian border in 1859, wanting to "...die in a quiet corner, like a wounded denizen of the forest". Bennet's health greatly improved, and visited Italy the next year, but found the "unhygienic state of the large towns of that classical land undid the good previously obtained". He returned to Menton and started a medical practice, and completely healed, returned to England in the Summer to see his patients. His routine would be to spend Winter in Menton, and take a holiday in April and May, to study the Mediterranean climate and vegetation, traveling to Genoa, in Italy, before returning to England in the Summer.

Menton was connected by rail to Paris in 1869, which greatly increased the Alpes-Maritimes popularity as a destination for visitors. The construction of a rail link in 1861 between Nice and Ventimiglia, in Italy, meant that the coastal road could be avoided, which had previously been subjected to dangerous mudslides. Bennet still advised his patients to come to Menton by road to "enjoy the wonderful spectacle." At the foothills of the Alps, Menton was sheltered from the winds, cold and heavy rain that characterised the regions weather. Enjoying a winter in mild weather provided a psychological boost for Bennet's patients, he wrote that they were "so charmed by the sun, the spectacle of nature and vegetation, they almost forgot their troubles." Bennet described the attractions of Menton and the South of France to his patients, finding that invoking the "...beauties of nature, the magnificence of the sun ...the intoxication of the ever-changing sea, they were able to face the long and difficult journey to the south". Bennet felt that the hot and dry climate of the French Riviera as well as a proper diet cured tuberculosis sufferers.

With the publication of Bennet's books, Menton's popularity as a destination greatly increased. His books were translated into German, and published in the United States. From "two or three hotels" in Menton in 1861, over 30 hotels had been built by 1875.

Notable patients of Bennet's included Robert Louis Stevenson and Queen Victoria.
Bennet bought a ruined tower with land on the hills above Menton, creating an eight-acre garden. He would also travel to San Remo and Marseille to meet experts in horticulture. Bennet's garden was even visited by Queen Victoria and her youngest daughter, Princess Beatrice.

A street, Rue J.H. Bennet is named after Bennet in Menton, and a monument was erected to Bennett in Menton's Rue Partouneaux.

Bibliography
Winter and Spring on the Shores of the Mediterranean (1861)
A Practical Treatise on Uterine Diseases
Nutrition in Health and Disease
A Review of the Present State of Uterine Pathology
On the Treatment of Pulmonary Consumption In Its Connexion with Modern Doctrines

References

1816 births
1891 deaths
19th-century English medical doctors
English expatriates in France
English travel writers
French Riviera
People in health professions from Manchester
English male non-fiction writers
19th-century English male writers